Richards High School is a public high school located in Richards, Texas (USA) and classified as a 1A school by the UIL. It is a part of the Richards Independent School District located in south central Grimes County. In 2015, the school was rated "Met Standard" by the Texas Education Agency.

Athletics

The Richards Panthers compete in these sports - 
 
Basketball
Cross Country
Golf
Track and Field
Volleyball

State Titles

Boys Basketball 
1976(B)

References

External links
Richards ISD

Schools in Grimes County, Texas
Public high schools in Texas